Shediac Bay-Dieppe is a provincial electoral district for the Legislative Assembly of New Brunswick, Canada.  It was first contested in the 2014 general election, having been created in the 2013 redistribution of electoral boundaries.

The district runs from the coastal communities of Cocagne and Grande-Digue inland to include parts of the city of Dieppe.  It drew significant pockets of population from three former electoral districts: Kent South, Dieppe Centre-Lewisville and Memramcook-Lakeville-Dieppe; as well as minor parts from Shediac-Cap-Pelé.

Brian Gallant, the 33rd Premier of New Brunswick, was re-elected in this district in 2014 and 2018.

Members of the Legislative Assembly

Election results

|-

References

External links 
Website of the Legislative Assembly of New Brunswick
Map of riding as of 2018

New Brunswick provincial electoral districts
Politics of Dieppe, New Brunswick